Poll is a quarter of the city of Cologne, in North Rhine-Westphalia, Germany. It is part of the borough of Porz.

Location 
Polls natural border to the west is the Rhine. To the south it is the Bundesautobahn 4 and the Cologne Rodenkirchen Bridge, to the east Bundesautobahn 559 and to the north the railroad embankment leading to the Südbrücke, which is crossing the Rhine.

History 
Poll was already inhabited during the New Stone Age; etymologically the name originates in a meaning like Swamp. The first documentary mentioning of Poll was on 1. April 1003 by monks from nearby Deutz Abbey, which was part of the Electorate of Cologne. The village Poll was suburbanized in 1889 and became a quarter of Cologne. Since 1975 it is part of city district Porz.

Transportation 
Poll is served by the Bundesautobahn 4, Bundesautobahn 559 and three light rail stations of the Cologne Stadtbahn line 7. The Cologne Rodenkirchen Bridge connects Poll with Rodenkirchen. Destroyed due to an airstrike on 14 January 1945 it was rebuilt from 1952 to 1954. The Südbrücke was also destroyed in January 1945 and is in service again since 1950. This railway bridge is used mainly for goods traffic.

References 

Boroughs and quarters of Cologne
1000s establishments in the Holy Roman Empire
1003 establishments in Europe
Porz